William Key may refer to:
 William Key (footballer), Scottish footballer
 William S. Key, United States Army general
 William Ryan Key, American singer, songwriter, and musician